Faras Hamdan (1910 – 29 November 1966) was an Israeli Arab politician who served as a member of the Knesset for the Agriculture and Development party between 1951 and 1959.

Biography
Hamdan was born in Baqa al-Gharbiyye during the Ottoman era. In 1944, he was elected head of local council of his village, where he later established a citrus confectionery factory.

In 1951, he was elected to the Knesset as head of the Agriculture and Development list, which was associated with the ruling Mapai party. The party joined David Ben-Gurion's government, but Hamdan did not receive a ministerial portfolio.

He was re-elected in 1955, and again joined the governing coalition. For the 1959 elections, the party was headed by Mahmud A-Nashaf. It won only one seat and Hamdan lost his place in the Knesset.

He died in 1966.

References

External links

 

1910 births
1966 deaths
Date of birth missing
Place of death missing
20th-century Israeli businesspeople
Agriculture and Development leaders
Arab members of the Knesset
Arab people in Mandatory Palestine
Arabs in Ottoman Palestine
Mayors of local councils in Israel
Members of the 2nd Knesset (1951–1955)
Members of the 3rd Knesset (1955–1959)
People from Baqa al-Gharbiyye